Gwere, or Lugwere, is the language spoken by  the Gwere people (Bagwere), a Bantu people found in the eastern part of Uganda.  It has a close dialectical resemblance to Soga and Ganda, which neighbour the Gwere.

Gwere, though closest in dialect to its eastern neighbours, also has many words similar to those used by tribes from the western part of Uganda.
For example, musaiza (a man) resembles mushiiza used by the western languages with the same meaning.

The Ruli, a somewhat distant people living in central Uganda, speak a language that has almost exactly the same words used in Lugwere, but with a very different pronunciation.

Orthography and alphabet 
 a - a - [ɑ]
 aa - aa - [ɑː]
 b - ba - [β]
 bb - bba - [b]
 c - ca - [c]
 d - da - [d]
 e - e - [e]
 ee - ee - [eː]
 f - fa - [f]
 g - ga - [g]
 i - i - [i]
 ii - ii - [iː]
 j - ja - [ɟ]
 k - ka - [k]
 l - la - [l]
 m - ma - [m]
 n - na - [n]
 ny - nya - [ɲ]
 ŋ - ŋa - [ŋ]
 o - o - [o]
 oo - oo - [oː]
 p - pa - [p]
 r - ra - [r]
 s - sa - [s]
 t - ta - [t]
 u - u - [u]
 uu - uu - [uː]
 v - va - [v]
 w - wa - [w]
 y - ya - [j]
 z - za - [z]

References

Languages of Uganda
Nyoro-Ganda languages